Oscar Lino Lopes Fernandes Braga (30 September 1931 – 26 May 2020) was the Roman Catholic bishop of the Roman Catholic Diocese of Benguela, Angola. A priest since 26 July 1964, Braga Portugal was the Bishop of the Diocese of Benguela since 2 February 1975 until his retirement on 18 February 2008.

References

1931 births
2020 deaths
Portuguese Roman Catholic bishops
20th-century Roman Catholic bishops in Angola
21st-century Roman Catholic bishops in Angola
Portuguese expatriates in Angola
Roman Catholic bishops of Benguela